Hortonia floribunda is a species of plant in the Monimiaceae family. It is endemic to Sri Lanka.

Culture
Known as "වෑවිය - wewiya" in Sinhala.

References

 https://web.archive.org/web/20140903134959/http://www.pdn.ac.lk/cjsbs/cjsps/text/text31.2.pdf
 http://www.clarinsusa.com/en/hortonia_floribunda.html
 http://www.theplantlist.org/tpl1.1/record/kew-2853686

Flora of Sri Lanka
Monimiaceae